Mary Veronica Gauthier (born March 11, 1962) is a Grammy-nominated American folk singer-songwriter and author, whose songs have been covered by performers including Tim McGraw, Blake Shelton, Kathy Mattea, Boy George and Jimmy Buffett. She has won multiple awards, including at the International Folk Music Awards, the Independent Music Awards, and from the Americana Association. Mary's songs often deal with marginalization, informed by her experience of addiction and recovery, and growing up gay, and demonstrate an "ability to transform her own trauma into a purposeful and communal narrative". Her 2018 album Rifles & Rosary Beads, co-written with military veterans and their families, has been hailed as a landmark achievement.

Life and career

Early life, addiction and sobriety
Gauthier was born in 1962 in New Orleans, Louisiana, to a mother who gave her to St Vincent's Women and Infants Asylum, where she spent the first year of her life. In adulthood, Mary spoke to her biological mother once by phone, but there was no further contact between them. She was adopted by an Italian Catholic couple from Thibodaux, Louisiana. Her father was an alcoholic. Struggling with a variety of issues, Gauthier abused drugs and alcohol, as did her brother, who was three years younger and also adopted. He was later jailed for armed robbery. Mary says she had drunk herself unconscious on sloe gin by the time she was twelve. When she was fifteen she ran away from home, recalling that "I was a gay kid, and back then, that just didn’t fly. Back then, gay kids were taking their own lives. It was horrible, and I just wanted to get away.” Mary spent the next several years in drug rehabilitation, halfway houses, and living with friends; she spent her eighteenth birthday in a jail cell. These experiences provided fodder for her songwriting later on. Spurred on by friends, she enrolled at Louisiana State University as a philosophy major, dropping out during her senior year. After attending the Cambridge School of Culinary Arts, and working in an upmarket restaurant, she got financial backing to open a Cajun restaurant in Boston's Back Bay neighborhood, calling it Dixie Kitchen. On opening night, 12 July 1990, she was arrested for drunk driving and has been sober ever since. "I eventually got sober when I was twenty seven years old... I started writing songs in earnest at around thirty two years of age", she says. After achieving sobriety from "[mainly] alcohol, cocaine and heroin", Mary continued to manage, and cook at, the restaurant but was increasingly driven to dedicate herself to songwriting.

Music career
Having recorded her debut, Dixie Kitchen, Gauthier sold her share in the restaurant to finance her second album. Drag Queens in Limousines was released in 1998, winning several accolades, and led to appearances at eleven major folk festivals, including Newport. After moving to Nashville in 2001, she secured a publishing deal with Harlan Howard Songs, followed by her third album, Filth and Fire, in 2002. The following year she landed a record deal with Lost Highway, a division of Universal Music, and released the first of two albums with them.

Mercy Now won widespread acclaim and propelled Mary into the spotlight, making the Top Ten Albums list in dozens of publications. A second album for Lost Highway, Between Daylight and Dark, followed in 2007. Gauthier's next studio record, The Foundling (2010), was released by Razor & Tie Records. She then made the first of several albums for In The Black Records, LIVE at Blue Rock (2013), her first live album which was recorded outside of Austin, Texas. Mary's eighth studio album, Trouble and Love (2014), demonstrated her now familiar "brutal honesty balanced by rough-hewn tenderness" to great effect. The following year, Gauthier featured on Eight 30 Records' Cold and Bitter Tears: The Songs of Ted Hawkins, contributing her take on the late Los Angeles busker's signature song, Sorry You're Sick.

Rifles & Rosary Beads
Gauthier's next record, Rifles & Rosary Beads (2018), was co-written with U.S. veterans and their families, arising out of Mary's involvement with the Songwriting With Soldiers program. Mary notes that "[every] day, on average, twenty-two veterans commit suicide", adding that "[underneath] so much of the problems in the world is trauma, it's the central issue humanity is dealing with. We've found something powerful here, that brings hope to people who are hurting". The album was released to widespread acclaim, and has been described as "music that's just plain important" (The LA Times), and as being "not only the strongest album of her career but, in its own way, a landmark album." It has won several awards, and secured Mary her first Grammy nomination.

Accolades, awards and influence
Throughout her career Gauthier has won widespread acclaim and numerous awards for her songs. In 2000, Drag Queens in Limousines won Best Folk/Singer-Songwriter Song at the first Independent Music Awards. Gauthier was nominated for Best New Artist at the Boston Music Awards, and also for three Gay and Lesbian American Music Awards (GLAMAs), winning best country artist. In 2002, Filth and Fire was named Best Indy CD of the Year by Jon Pareles of The New York Times. Mercy Now made the 2003 Top Ten Albums list in The New York Times, The LA Times, The Daily News, and Billboard Magazine, and was voted the No. 6 Record of the Decade by No Depression magazine. Gauthier was named Emerging Artist of the Year by the Americana Music Association in 2005.

The Foundling was named the No. 3 Record of the Year by The LA Times music writer Randy Lewis, in 2010. In 2015, Gauthier was nominated for the Outstanding Music Artist of the Year at the 26th Annual GLAAD Media Awards. Rifles & Rosary Beads earned Gauthier her first Grammy nomination in the category of Best Folk Album (2019), and won Album of the Year at The International Folk Music Awards. She was also nominated for Album of the Year at the Americana Music Honors and Awards, and named International Artist of the Year by the UK Americana Music Association.

Numerous artists have recorded Gauthier's songs, including Jimmy Buffett, Tim McGraw, Blake Shelton, Bobby Bare, Boy George, Bill Chambers, Mike Farris, Candi Staton, Amy Helm, Kathy Mattea and Bettye LaVette. Mike Farris and Bettye LaVette both received Grammy nominations, LaVette for Best Blues Record (2016) for Worthy, the title track of which was written by Mary Gauthier and Beth Nielsen Chapman. Farris took home the Grammy for Best Roots Gospel Album (2015) for Shine for All the People, which included Gauthier's song "Mercy Now". Her songs have also been featured in several TV shows, including Nashville on ABC, Masterpiece Theatre's Case Histories, Showtime's Banshee, HBO's Injustice and Paramount Network's Yellowstone.

Mary's recordings have appeared on playlists by Wally Lamb, Tom Waits and Bob Dylan. She has completed a memoir about the art of songwriting, Saved by a Song (St. Martin's Press) to be released July 6, 2021. Mary is a regular on the Grand Ole Opry, and currently resides in Nashville, Tennessee.

Education, publications and writing
Mary Gauthier's songs are taught at several universities, including Alice Randall's "Country Lyric in American Culture” class at Vanderbilt University. Her short stories have been published in several books and magazines, including Amplified (Random House), The Blue Rock Review, an arts magazine based in Wimberley, Texas, and the Capitola Review, a handcrafted, numbered, limited edition publication. Gauthier has been featured in various books on country and Americana music, with chapters dedicated to her in "They Came To Nashville", by Marshall Chapman, and "Right By Her Roots: Americana Women and Their Songs", by Jewly Height. Mary also features in a Dutch book on country music, "De Bezem Door Nashville (The Broom Through Nashville)", by Harry de Jong, with photographs by Henk Bleeker.

Discography
 Dixie Kitchen (1997)
 Drag Queens in Limousines (1999)
 Filth and Fire (2002)
 Mercy Now (2005)
 Between Daylight and Dark (2007)
 Genesis (The Early Years) (2008) – A 15-track compilation from the first three albums
 The Foundling (2010) – No. 13 Billboard Americana chart
 The Foundling Alone (2011) – Acoustic demos of songs in development, from The Foundling
 Live at Blue Rock (2012) – 11 mixed new and old tracks plus hidden track, "Mercy Now"
 Trouble and Love (2014) – No. 22 Billboard Americana chart
 Rifles & Rosary Beads (2018) – Co-written with U.S. veterans and their families
 Dark Enough to See the Stars (2022)

References

External links
 
 Gauthier's Lost Highway webpage
 Article on Mary Gauthier and Iris DeMent

1962 births
American alternative country singers
American women singer-songwriters
American folk singers
American women country singers
American country singer-songwriters
Cajun people
American lesbian musicians
American LGBT singers
American LGBT songwriters
LGBT people from Louisiana
Living people
People from Thibodaux, Louisiana
Musicians from New Orleans
American adoptees
Lesbian singers
Lesbian songwriters
Lost Highway Records artists
Independent Music Awards winners
Singer-songwriters from Louisiana
Country musicians from Louisiana
Proper Records artists
Signature Sounds artists
20th-century American LGBT people
21st-century American LGBT people
American lesbian writers